Akbar II (22 April 1760 – 28 September 1837), also known as Akbar Shah II, was the Nineteenth Mughal emperor of India. He reigned from 1806 to 1837. He was the second son of Shah Alam II and the father of Bahadur Shah II

Akbar had little de facto power due to the increasing British influence in India through the East India Company. He sent Ram Mohan Roy as an ambassador to Britain and gave him the title of Raja. During his regime, in 1835, the East India Company discontinued calling itself subject of the Mughal Emperor and issuing coins in his name. The Persian lines in the company's coins to this effect were deleted.

Akbar II is credited with starting the Hindu–Muslim unity festival Phool Walon Ki Sair. His grave lies next to the dargah of 13th-century Sufi saint Qutbuddin Bakhtiar Kaki at Mehrauli.

Early life

Prince Mirza Akbar was born on 22 April 1760 to Emperor Shah Alam II at Mukundpur, Satna, while his father was in exile. On 2 May 1781, at the Red Fort, the prince was made Crown prince with the title of Wali Ahd Bahadur, after the death of his elder brother. In 1782, he was appointed the viceroy of Delhi until 1799. When the Rohilla leader Ghulam Qadir captured Delhi in 1788, the young Prince Mirza Akbar was forced to nautch dance along with other Mughal princes and princesses. He witnessed how the members of the imperial Mughal family were humiliated, as well as starved. When Shah Jahan IV fled, Mirza Akbar was titular Emperor with the title of Akbar Shah II, and was to remain acting emperor even after the reinstatement of his father Shah Alam II, till January 1789.

Reign

Emperor Akbar II presided over an empire titularly large but in effect limited to the Red Fort in Delhi alone. The cultural life of Delhi as a whole flourished during his reign. However, his attitude towards East India Company officials, especially Lord Hastings, to whom he refused to grant an audience on terms other than those of subject and sovereign, although honourable to him, increasingly frustrated the British, who regarded him as merely their pensioner. The British therefore reduced his titular authority to 'King of Delhi' in 1835 and the East India Company ceased to act as the mere lieutenants of the Mughal Empire as they did from 1803 to 1835. Simultaneously they replaced Persian text with English text on the company's coins, which no longer carried the emperor's name.

The British encouraged the Nawab of Oudh and the Nizam of Hyderabad to take royal titles in order to further diminish the Emperor's status and influence. Out of deference, the Nizam did not, but the Nawab of Awadh did so.

He is also known to have bestowed the title Nawab upon the Nawab of Tonk and Nawab of Jaora.

Akbar II appointed the Bengali reformer Ram Mohan Roy, to appeal against his treatment by the East India Company, conferring on him the title of Raja. Ram Mohan Roy then visited England, as the Mughal envoy to the Court of St. James. Ram Mohan Roy submitted a well-argued memorial on behalf of the Mughal ruler, but to no avail.

The grave of Akbar II lies within a marble enclosure adjoined to the Moti Masjid near the dargah of the 13th century Sufi saint, Qutbuddin Bakhtiar Kaki at Mehrauli, Delhi. The Mughal emperors Bahadur Shah I, (Shah Alam I) and Shah Alam II are also buried here.

Descendants

After the mutiny, cousins of Mirza Mughal, son of Bahadur Shah Zafar, son of Akbar II, escaped to neighbouring areas in fear of capture by the British. Prince Mirza Mughal, the heir apparent was himself killed in battle. Many surviving princes settled in various provinces of India, but some settled in Burma and Bengal since a large number of imperial family members, along with Emperor Bahadur Shah II were exiled to Rangoon in Burma.

See also
 Akbar I
 Mirza Nali
 Jalaluddin Mirza
 Mirza Zafar

References

Bibliography
 

18th-century Indian monarchs
19th-century Indian monarchs
Mughal emperors
1760 births
1837 deaths
19th-century Indian Muslims
People from Satna district